The following is a list of indoor arenas in Brazil with a capacity of at least 3,000 spectators. 
Most of the arenas in this list have multiple uses such as individual sports, team sports as well as cultural events and political events.

Currently in Use

References

See also 
List of football stadiums in Brazil
List of indoor arenas by capacity

 
Brazil
Indoor arenas
Indoor arenas